Aleksandr Brazevich (born 1 June 1973) is a Belarusian football manager and former player.

Career
Brazevich retired from playing career at the age of 21 after two years at Ataka-Aura Minsk. He began his coaching career in 2003, working as a youth coach for MTZ-RIPO Minsk. In 2010, he led Torpedo Zhodino to the Belarusian Cup final.

Since 2015, he was working at BATE Borisov as scouting and youth development program director.

On 24 October 2017, defending Lithuanian champions Žalgiris Vilnius hired Brazevich as an interim head coach to replace Valdas Dambrauskas. He was released by the club on 24 November 2017, after managing for 5 games, due to club's failure to secure A Lyga title.

In October 2020, Brazevich was appointed head coach of FC Slutsk.

References

External links
 Career summary at Pressball website (2010)
 

1973 births
Living people
Belarusian footballers
Association football midfielders
FC Ataka Minsk players
Belarusian football managers
Belarusian expatriate football managers
Expatriate football managers in Lithuania
FK Tauras Tauragė managers
FC Smorgon managers
FC Torpedo Zhodino managers
FC Vedrich-97 Rechitsa managers
FC Torpedo Mogilev managers
FC Smolevichi managers
FK Žalgiris managers
FC Slutsk managers